The Lyric Theatre grew out of Austin Clarke's Dublin Verse Speaking Society. It is no longer operating.

References
Igoe, Vivien. A Literary Guide to Dublin. (Methuen, 1994) 
Ryan, Philip B. The Lost Theatres of Dublin. (The Badger Press, 1998) 

Theatres in Dublin (city)